The 2010–11 season was Klubi i Futbollit Tirana's 72nd competitive season, 72nd consecutive season in the Kategoria Superiore, and 90th year in existence as a football club. Following the title win two seasons ago, KF Tirana added to their 23 titles to make it their record 24 title wins. KF Tirana played UEFA Europa League against Zalaegerszegi TE and FC Utrecht.

Background

Kit
Supplier: Adidas
Sponsor: --

Other information

Coaching staff

Players

2010–11 squad

Out on loan

International players

Foreign players

Reserves and academy

Competitions

Kategoria Superiore

League table

Results summary

Results by round

Matches

Albanian Cup

First round

Second round

Quarter-finals

Semi-finals

Final

UEFA Europa League

First qualifying round

Second qualifying round

Notes

References

2010-11
Albanian football clubs 2010–11 season